On December 19, 1946, Viet Minh soldiers detonated explosives in Hanoi, and the ensuing battle, known as the Battle of Hanoi marked the opening salvo of the First Indochina War.

History
On September 14, 1946, France and the DRV had signed a modus vivendi, promising reciprocal rights and negotiations to end armed hostilities. The French did not follow through with any political concessions. In November 1946, local disputes led to colonialist massacres at Haiphong, "Langson" (Lạng Sơn) and "Tourane" (Da Nang). Then, France landed reinforcements at Da Nang in violation of an accord signed on March 6, 1946.

Viet Minh set off explosives, at 20:03 in the evening of December 19, 1946, after smuggling them past French Army guards into the city's power plant. The explosion plunged Hanoi into darkness, and throughout the city the Viet-Minh began attacking French military positions and French homes. About 600 French civilians were abducted during this time. Surviving French troops, alerted by friendly spies, gradually gained a numerical superiority. French artillery shelled the city, and house to house searches were conducted searching for the Viet-Minh leadership.

Ho Chi Minh was at the time ill with fever, and Võ Nguyên Giáp ordered "all soldiers... to stand together, go into battle, destroy the invaders, and save the nation". Eventual French superiority in firepower forced the Viet-Minh to withdraw to the mountains 80 miles to the north of Hanoi.

After expunging the Viet-Minh from the city, the French demanded the military surrender of their opponents, but the latter refused. The United States, alarmed at the incident, dispatched Abbot Low Moffat on a special mission to Saigon and Hanoi to consider a negotiated referendum. However, the realization that the Viet-Minh would not accept any compromise, and the fact that the US did not want to formally mediate between the two sides, led to the US abandoning the idea.

Gallery

Memorials
 Monument Determined to Brave Death for the Survival of the Fatherland by artist Nguyễn-kim-Giao at Hàng-Dầu Street.
 Monument Determined to Brave Death for the Survival of the Fatherland by artists Vũ-đại-Bình and Mai-văn-Kế at Vạn-Xuân Park.
 Bronze sculpture Lunge Mine soldier by artist Trần-văn-Hòe.
 Sculpture Hanoi in the winter 1946 by Ngũ-xã's artists at the Đồng-Xuân Market.
 Statue of Nguyen Van Thieng holding his Lunge Anti-Tank Mine at the Vietnam Military History Museum in Hanoi, Vietnam.

References

 
William J. Duiker (2000). Ho Chi Minh. Hachette Books, New York.
 
 
 
 
 
 
 
 

1946 in French Indochina
1947 in French Indochina
1946 in Vietnam
Battles and operations of the First Indochina War
Battles involving France
Battles involving Vietnam
Conflicts in 1946
Vietnamese independence movement
History of Hanoi
20th century in Hanoi